Malvina was launched in 1796 in the United States. She first appeared in British on-line sources in 1800 as a West Indiaman. She made one voyage as a slave ship in the triangular trade in enslaved persons between May 1803 and late 1804, when she was captured.

Career
Malvina, Christie, master, had arrived in the Clyde on 31 July 1800 from Charleston. 

In January 1803 Lloyd's List reported that Malvina, Car, master, was at Goree.

Captain James Watt(s) acquired a letter of marque on 30 May 1803. He sailed from London 14 June 1803. Malvina arrived at Surinam in June 1804. She had embarked 273 slaves and disembarked 250.

Tracing Malvinas subsequent history becomes difficult.

The database on the Trans-Atlantic slave trade reports that Malvina left Suriname on 19 July and arrived back at London on 25 September 1804 with Kavannah, master. However, Malvina, Kavanagh, master, appears to have been a vessel of 353 tons (bm), launched at the British "Plantations" (colonies), in 1801. The volume of the Register of Shipping for 1806 showed her with Humble, owner, and having sailed between London and Suriname.

The volume of the Register of Shipping for 1804 carried the annotation "Captured" by the name of Malvina, Watts, master. 

A French privateer captured a Malvina, Carr, master, on 2 December 1803, near Scilly as Malvina was on her way from Savannah to London. The privateer sent her into Saint-Malo. By one report the privateer was Braave, of Saint-Malo, and she sent her prize into Nantes. This capture took place before Malvina, Watts, master, arrived in Suriname. The Malvina, Carr, master, that had been captured was probably the Malvina of 246 tons (bm), launched in Maryland in 1790. The volume of LR for 1804 showed her with H.Dawson, master, J.Murray, owner, and trade Liverpool–Savannah. The discrepancy in the masters' names is not ideal, but not definitive as the registers often carried stale or inaccurate data.

LR continued to carry Malvina, Watts, master, until 1809 with data unchanged since 1804.

Citations

1796 ships
Age of Sail merchant ships of England
London slave ships
Captured ships